The Arab American Action Network (AAAN) is a Chicago-based community center founded in 1995 to strengthen the Arab immigrant and Arab American communities in the Chicago area by building their capacity to be active agents for positive social change. As a grassroots nonprofit, its strategies include community organizing, advocacy, education, providing social services, leadership development, cultural outreach, and forging productive relationships with other communities.

Rasmea Odeh, convicted in the 1969 Jerusalem Supermarket bombing is the AAAN's associate director. 

Its vision is for a strong Arab American community whose members have the power to make decisions about actions and policies that affect their lives; and have access to a range of social, political, cultural, and economic opportunities in a context of equity and social justice.  The organization is a pioneer in domestic violence prevention and intervention, adult education, and youth organizing programming, as well as a strong advocate for women.

The AAAN is the brainchild of a number of leading Arab activists and organizers, including members of its precursor organization, the Arab Community Center; academics and intellectuals; business-people; and former Columbia University School of International and Public Affairs Assistant Dean Mona Khalidi.   It is a core member of the Chicago Cultural Alliance, a consortium of 25 ethnic museums and cultural centers in Chicago; the Illinois Coalition for Immigrant and Refugee Rights (ICIRR); the National Network for Arab American Communities (NNAAC); and the Chicago Alliance Against Racist and Political Repression (CAARPR); amongst other coalitions, alliances, and networks.

Programs 

Partnership with Illinois Department of Human Services

The AAAN works closely with ICIRR and the Illinois Department of Human Services and its case managers to provide interpretation services specifically intended for Arab-Americans who are currently accessing public benefits.  The joint goal of the AAAN and the Illinois DHS is to ensure that benefits are received and utilized equally amongst all prospective recipients by ensuring that there are no linguistic or cultural barriers where administration of these benefits are concerned.

Case Management

Over 3,000 families in the community utilize the AAAN for translation, interpretation, and transportation services, plus an extensive referral system that supports legal assistance, housing advocacy, counseling, childcare, and other services. 

English As A Second Language (ESL)

In collaboration with the Illinois Community College Board (ICCB) and Chicago's Chinese Mutual Aid Association, the AAAN provides three levels of ESL classes for over 100 women per year on the southwest side of Chicago.

References

Arab-American culture in Chicago
Arab-American organizations
Organizations established in 1995